Pietro Bettelini (6 September 1763 – 27 September 1829) was a Swiss engraver.

Life
Bettelini was born in Caslano, and began studying art at a young age. He received instruction from Gandolfi and Bartolozzi; but in his subsequent works he inclined more to the style of Raphael Morghen. He died at Rome in 1828.

Works
Bettelini was held in high estimation by Thorwaldsen, who employed him to engrave some of his finest works, both figures and bassi-rilievi. His engraving of the Entombment, by Andrea del Sarto, in the Florence Gallery is considered among his finest examples of art. His works include:

Entombment; after Andrea del Sarto.
Madonna col devoto; after the painting by Correggio, in the possession of the King of Bavaria.
Ecce Homo; after Correggio.
St. John; after Domenichino.
Sibylla Persica; after Guercino.
Ascension of the Virgin; after Guido.
Madonna and sleeping Infant; after Raphael.
Judgment of Solomon; after the same.
Magdalene; after Schidone.
Maria div. Sapientiae; after Titian.
The Virgin Mary reading a book; after the same.
Portrait of Galileo.Portrait of Machiavelli.Portrait of Poliziano''.

He worked with Giuseppe Bortignoni the Younger in engraving ceiling decorations from the Vatican.

References

Attribution:
 

1763 births
1829 deaths
People from Lugano
18th-century Italian painters
Italian male painters
19th-century Italian painters
Italian neoclassical painters
Italian engravers
19th-century Italian male artists
18th-century Italian male artists